Oriand Abazaj (born 17 January 1985 in Tirana) is an Albanian footballer who has played for a number of sides in both the Albanian Superliga and the Albanian First Division, including KF Tirana, Kastrioti Krujë,  Shkumbini Peqin and Partizani Tirana.

References

1985 births
Living people
Footballers from Tirana
Albanian footballers
Association football midfielders
Association football forwards
Albanian men's footballers
Besëlidhja Lezhë players
KF Apolonia Fier players
KS Shkumbini Peqin players
KS Kastrioti players
KF Tirana players
KF Elbasani players
KF Bylis Ballsh players
KF Laçi players
FK Partizani Tirana players
Kategoria Superiore players
Albania youth international footballers